The Canyon of Adventure is a 1928 American silent Western film directed by Albert S. Rogell and written by Marion Jackson and Ford Beebe. The film stars Ken Maynard, Virginia Brown Faire, Eric Mayne, Theodore Lorch, Tyrone Brereton and Hal Salter. The film was released on April 22, 1928, by First National Pictures.

Cast  
 Ken Maynard as Steven Bancroft
 Virginia Brown Faire as Dolores Castanares
 Eric Mayne as Don Miguel Castanares
 Theodore Lorch as Don Alfredo Villegas
 Tyrone Brereton as Luis Villegas
 Hal Salter as Jake Leach
 Billy Franey as Buzzard Koke
 Slim Whitaker as Slim Burke 
 Tarzan as Tarzan

References

External links
 

1928 films
1920s English-language films
1928 Western (genre) films
First National Pictures films
Films directed by Albert S. Rogell
American black-and-white films
Silent American Western (genre) films
1920s American films